The following is a list of notable foreign recipients of the Legion of Honor by their country of origin. The Legion of Honor is the highest decoration in France. and is divided into five degrees: Chevalier (Knight), Officier (Officer), Commandeur (Commander), Grand Officier (Grand Officer) and Grand Croix (Grand Cross).

Membership in the Legion of Honor is restricted to French nationals. Foreign nationals who have served France or the ideals it upholds may, however, receive a distinction of the Légion, which is nearly the same thing as membership in the Légion. Foreign nationals who live in France are submitted to the same requirements as Frenchmen. Foreign nationals who live abroad may be awarded a distinction of any rank or dignity in the Légion.

A complete, chronological list of the members of the Legion of Honor nominated from the very first ceremony in 1803 to now does not exist. The number is estimated at one million. Among them about 3,000 were decorated with the Grand Cross (including 1,200 French).

Albania 

Grand Officer
 Ismail Kadare (2020), a writer
 Iliaz Vrioni, politician
Commander
 Edi Rama (2017), Albanian Prime Minister
Chevalier
 Fatos Kongoli (2010), a writer
Officier

 Drita Hadaj (2014), Professor

Algeria 

Algeria was part of France from 1830 to 1962
Grand Cross
 Abdelkader El Djezairi (1860), religious and military leader who led a struggle against the French colonial invasion in the mid-19th century. In 1860, Abdelkader, who was living in exile in Syria, fought to save thousands of Christians in Damascus during the conflict between the Druze and Maronites. The French government then bestowed on him the Grand Cross of the Légion d'honneur
 Si Kaddour Benghabrit (1939), official and founder of the Muslim Institute of the Great Mosque of Paris
 (1856-1940), bachaga of the Larbaa 

Grand Officer
 Said Boualam (1978), colonel in the French Army, and the founder of the Front Algérie Française, a political and militant movement in favour of French Algeria

Chevalier
 Saïd Cid Kaoui (1904), berberologist, lexicographer and interpreter officer of the 1st class.

Argentina 
Chevalier
 Adolfo Bioy Casares (1981), writer.
 Ernesto Sabato (1979, Chevalier; 1986 Commander), writer, humanist, former member of the CONADEP, founder and first President of the Fundación Ernesto Sabato.
 Juan David Nasio (1999), Psicoanalista, Médico psiquiatra, escritor.

Officier
 Victoria Ocampo (1962), writer, critic; founder, publisher and director of Sur, philanthropist.

Commander
 Jorge Luis Borges (1983), writer, teacher.

Grand Cross
 Mauricio Macri (2016), president of Argentina

Australia 

Grand Officer
General Sir John Monash,  (1919), Appointed Grand Officier during World War I

Commander
 Stephen Brady AO CVO, (2017), Australian Ambassador to France
Sir Ninian Stephen (dec'd),  (1983), Governor-General of Australia
Air Chief Marshal Sir Angus Houston,  (2007), former Chief of the Defence Force
 Air Chief Marshal Mark Binskin,  (2017), Chief of the Defence Force, Appointed Chevalier in 2015

Officer
Major General Sir John Gellibrand,  (1919), Commander 3rd Australian Division, Appointed Officier during World War I
Major General Sir Thomas Glasgow,  (1919), Commander 1st Australian Division, Appointed Officier during World War I
Major General Sir Charles Rosenthal,  (1919), Commander 2nd Australian Division, Appointed Officier during World War I
George Beattie Lean (1983), Chairman of Peko-Wallsend, President of the France-Australia Industrial Round Table
Ross Steele,  (2008), for promoting the teaching of French language and culture. Was also appointed Chevalier in 1996
General Sir Peter Cosgrove, Governor General of Australia
General David Hurley,  (2012), Governor of New South Wales
Vice Admiral Ray Griggs,  (25 March 2014), Chief of Navy
Dame Marie Bashir,  (2014), Governor of New South Wales. Was also appointed Chevalier in 2009
Lieutenant General David Morrison,  (July 2014), Chief of Army.
Vice Admiral Tim Barrett,  (8 April 2017), Chief of Navy.
Vice Admiral David Johnston,  (16 November 2018), Vice Chief of the Defence Force.
Nancy Wake, partisan of the French Resistance in World War 2

Chevalier
Lieutenant Colonel Sir Michael Bruxner,  (1917), later to become a prominent NSW politician, was appointed as a Chevalier "in recognition of distinguished services" during the Sinai and Palestine Campaign in the First World War
Lieutenant General Sir Leslie Morshead,  (1919), 33rd Battalion, AIF, Appointed Officier during World War I
 James Taylor (1927), Australian Olympic Federation President
Professor Francis Patrick Donovan  (1998), appointed Chevalier in recognition of services to the International Court of Arbitration and the relationship between France and Australia. 
 Charlie Mance (Age 98) travelled to France in 1998 to receive the medal for serving in France as an ally in World War One.
Tom Hughes,  (2005), prominent barrister and Attorney-General in the Gorton Government, appointed Chevalier for his contribution as an RAAF pilot in the D-Day landings
Suzanne Cory,  (2009), professor of medical research with the Institut Pasteur
Duncan Kerr, Judge of the Federal Court of Australia (2011) 
His Honour Judge Warren C Fagan, QC, former president of the Administrative Appeals Tribunal of Victoria, officier de Palmes Académiques, former president de L'alliance Francaise de Melbourne, chevalier de Légion d'Honneur (2012)
Christopher Jenkins (2013) 
Professor Kurt Lambeck , (2013), geoscientist who helped establish the Centre national d'études spatiales
John Spender KC (2013) 
Edmund Charles Spencer World War I veteran awarded the Légion d'Honneur on the 80th anniversary of the armistice.
Rear Admiral Michael Noonan,  (October 2017), Deputy Chief of Navy
Cr Noel D'Souza (October 2020), Mayor of Randwick (2015-2017)
Graham Russell "Russ" Godden (1920–), Stirling bomber pilot in RAF 196 Squadron from 1944 to 1945, 38 Group, who, as well as flying supplies to Arnhem during Operation Market Garden (23 September 1994) and being tug pilot during Operation Varsity (Crossing of the Rhine, 24 March 1945), also piloted a Stirling bomber during Special Operation Executive missions to France and Norway, as well as dropping French S.A.S paratroops into the Netherlands during Operation Amherst (7 April 1945).
Donald Matheson was awarded the Knight in the National Order of the Legion of Honour by his Excellency Mr. Jean-Pierre Thébault, Ambassador of France to Australia, c/- Donald's son, Tesselaar Romanoff Matheson, on the 6th October 2022. This most prestigious distinction was awarded to Donald for his part during the Normandy Landings, on the 6th June 1944 aboard H.M.S Black Prince.

Austria 
Chevalier
Peter Engelmann, Philosopher and Publisher (2013)

Armenia 

Officier
Andranik Ozanian, military commander and statesman (1919)

Religious Leader
Karekin II,  Catholicos of All Armenians, the supreme head of the Armenian Apostolic Church

Azerbaijan 
Mehriban Aliyeva, The First Lady of Azerbaijan
Novruz Mammadov, Prime Minister of Azerbaijan (2019) for his contribution to the cooperation between Azerbaijan and France.

Bahrain 
Mohammed bin Jasim Alghatam, politician, scientist and army veteran received both Chevalier and Commandeur of the Légion d'Honneur

Bangladesh 
 Arshad-uz Zaman (first Bangladeshi) 
Sayeed Ahmed (1993)
Muhammad Yunus (Officer, 2004)
 Rasul Nizam (Chevalier, 2004)
 Partha Pratim Majumder (Chevalier, 2011)

Belgium 

 1984: Baron Charles-Ferdinand Nothomb, Knight Grand Officer
 1991: Roger Lallemand, commander.
 2011: Count Jacques Rogge, Officer.
 2013: 
Didier Reynders, Commander.
 2014: 
 Freddy Thielemans, Officer. 
 Eddy Merckx, commander.
 2016: 
 Marc Roche
 King Leopold II of Belgium, Knight Grand Cross.
 King Albert II of Belgium, Knight Grand Cross.
 Cardinal Désiré-Joseph Mercier.
 Count Paul de Smet de Naeyer, Knight Grand Cross.
 Lieutenant general Count Gerard Leman, Knight Grand Cross.
 Achille Van Acker, Knight Grand Cross.
 Jules Malou, Knight Grand Cross.
 Count Charles Liedts, Grand Officer.
 Baron Henry Delvaux de Fenffe, Grand Officer.
 Baron Alphonse Jacques de Dixmude, Grand Officer.
 Baron Auguste Lambermont, Grand Officer.
 Baron Édouard Descamps, Grand Officer.
 Count Paul Buysse, officer.
 Paul Breyne, Chevalier.
 Baron Auguste Goffinet, Officer.
 Baron Emile-Ernest de Cartier de Marchienne, Officer.
 Baron Paul Janssen, Officer.
 Knight François-Xavier de Donnea, Officer.
 Knight Antonin de Selliers de Moranville, Chevalier.
 Baron Willy Coppens de Houthulst, Commander
 Baron Édouard Empain, Commander.
 Marie Joseph Charles, 6th Duke d'Ursel, commander.
 Alfred Cluysenaar, Officer.
 Wilfried Martens, Grand Officer.
 Edmond Leburton, Grand Officer.
 Alfred Belpaire, Grand Officer.
 Louis Michel, Grand Officer.
 the 8th Duke d'Ursel, knight.
 Benoît Lengelé, Chevalier.
Albert van Dievoet, Officer.
Édouard van Dievoet, Officer.

Bosnia and Herzegovina 
Ivan Ceresnjes (1994), head of the Jewish community of Bosnia and Hercegovina, for non-sectarian humanitarian relief work during the Bosnian War.
Jovan Divjak (2001), Bosnian general and philanthropist
Vahid Halilhodžić (2004), former Bosnian football player, now successful football manager, received his Légion d'Honneur on 23. July 2004, during his tenure as manager of PSG
Jasmina Pašalić (2014), Bosnian diplomat

Brazil 

José Paranhos, Viscount of Rio Branco, was decorated with the Grand Cross
Pedro de Araújo Lima, Marquis of Olinda, was decorated with the Grand Cross
Emperor Dom Pedro II was decorated with the Grand Cross
Epitácio Lindolfo da Silva Pessoa, President, he was decorated with the Grand Cross
Senator Rodrigo Augusto da Silva, foreign minister in 1889, decorated with the Grand Cross
Fernando Henrique Cardoso, President, was decorated with the Grand Cross
Sergio Cabral Filho, Senator and Governor of Rio de Janeiro, was decorated with the Grand Cross.
José da Costa Carvalho, Marquis of Monte Alegre, Regent and Prime Minister, was decorated with the Grand Cross.

Burkina Faso

Chevalier 

 Christine Kafando (2011), HIV/AIDS activist

Cambodia 

Norodom Prohmbarirak, King of Cambodia, was awarded the Grand Cross in 1872.
Norodom Sihanouk, King, Prime Minister, and Chief of State of Cambodia, President of the State Presidium of Democratic Kampuchea.
Sisowath Monivong, King of Cambodia
Norodom Suramarit, King of Cambodia, awarded the grade of Commander in 1939 and Grand Officer.
Norodom Sihamoni, current King of Cambodia, awarded grade of Grand Officer.

Cameroon

Grand Officier 
 Jean Fochive (1971), Cameroon Director General of the Department of Documentation.

Canada 
Leonard Brierley, one of the first Canadian soldiers to land on Juno Beach during the D-Day Invasion, awarded the rank of Chevalier (knight) on 30 May 2007, by French Ambassador Daniel Jouanneau.
Jean Chapdelaine, Canadian diplomat and Quebec delegate-general to France.
Jan de Vries, a Canadian paratrooper from the Second World War and veteran's advocate was named a Chevalier in 2004.
Harry De Wolf, Vice Admiral and Chief of the Naval Staff and former commanding officer of HMCS Haida
Céline Dion, international celebrity, Canadian singer, appointed Chevalier de la Légion d'honneur
Joseph Reginald Martin, World War II Veteran, Royal Canadian Navy. Awarded the rank of Knight of the Legion of Honour in 2014 for aiding in the liberation of France.Ordre National de la Légion d’Honneur
Beverly McLachlin, Chief Justice of the Supreme Court, was made a Commander of the Legion of Honour by the Government of France in 2008
Madeleine Meilleur, an Ontarian MPP and Minister Responsible for Francophone Affairs.
Brian Mulroney, former Prime Minister of Canada, was presented the Legion of Honour in the rank of Commander, on 6 December 2016 by the French ambassador Nicolas Chapuis in Ottawa
Blair Neatby, WWII veteran, 17th Duke of York Canadian Hussars, was awarded the Legion of Honour in the rank of Chevalier in November 2015 for his participation in the liberation of France
Lance Corporal Joseph Novak, 98 years old WWII Veteran. Royal Canadian Army Service Corps served in France, Belgium, The Netherlands. He was honored as a Chevalier de la Légion d'Honneur by the Grand Chancellor  of the National Order of the Legion of Honour and the National Order of Merit, General Benoît Puga in Whitehorse, Yukon, Canada on 21 October 2021. https://www.cbc.ca/news/canada/north/yukon-veteran-france-national-order-whitehorse-1.6218537
Wilder Penfield, a Canadian neurosurgeon.
Pascal Poirier, author, lawyer and Canada's longest serving senator, he was honored as a Chevalier de la Légion d'Honneur in 1902.
Captain George Richardson, World War I member of the Canadian Expeditionary Force, promoted to captain as a result of being the sole survivor in the battle of Saint-Julienin Number 2 Company.
Arthur Britton Smith, World War II veteran
Lawson Arthur Walsh, 1899-2001 World War I 193rd Battalion Canadian Expeditionary Force. Turned 18 in the trenches of France and fought in the Battle of Vimy Ridge.
Phillip Francis Vernon Wragg, from the Royal Regina Rifles was among the first Canadian soldiers to land on Juno Beach and reach and hold their final objective during the Operation Overload, D-Day Invasion, was awarded the rank of Knight (Chevalier) of the Legion of Honour on 10 June 2015 for aiding in the liberation of France.
Sir Michael LaPlante, received the Legion of Honour in 2016, from the French Government and title of “Chevalier” (Knight); the highest French Order for military and civil merits.  Michael was born to Hazel Tapaquon and Michael LaPlante Sr. on the Kawacatoose First Nation, where he resided until he attended the Lestock Residential School.  He joined the army at a very young age and served with the Regina Rifle Regiment from 1943 to 1946. He was posted in England, France, Belgium, Netherlands and Germany. Sir Michael LaPlante began his Spiritual Journey on 27 December 2016 with daughter Celeste and niece Gloria by his side.

China 
Ma Chengyuan (1998). Archaeologist, Director of Shanghai Museum
Gong Li (2010). Actress, was appointed Commandeur for contributions to film
Huai Jinpeng (2012). Scientist, academian and politician, was appointed Knight for contributions to education, science and technology development across China and France.

Cuba 
Baron Claudio Brindis de Salas Garrido (1852–1911). Cuban musician. 
Dr. Carlos Finlay (1833–1915). Cuban physician and scientist. 
Loipa Araújo (born 1941). Prima ballerina and ballet teacher
Alicia Alonso (1920-2019). Cuban prima ballerina assoluta. 
Fulgencio Batista (1901–1973). Cuban president and dictator. 
Eusebio Leal (1942-2020). Cuban historian. 
Josefina Méndez (1941–2007). Cuban ballet dancer. 
Miguel Barnet (born 1940). Cuban writer. 
Carlos Manuel de Céspedes y Quesada (1871–1939). Cuban president. 
Emilio Núñez Portuondo (1898–1978). Cuban politician. 
Gonzalo de Quesada y Aróstegui (1868–1915). Cuban politician. 
Cosme de la Torriente y Peraza (1872–1956). Cuban politician. 
Dr. Joaquín Albarrán (1860–1912). Cuban physician. 
Alfredo Guevara (1925-2013). Cuban intellectual.
Eduardo Torres Cuevas (born 1942). Cuban historian and college professor.
Cardinal Jaime Lucas Ortega y Alamino (1936-2019). Cuban Catholic Church.
Dr. Domingo Gomez de Gimeranez (1903-1978). Cuban physician, scientist and mathematician. He rejected the distinction.
Dr. Jose A. Presno Bastiony (1876-1953). Cuban physician.
Maria López Vigil (born 1944). Cuban writer.
Dr. Rodrigo Alvarez Cambras (born 1934). Cuban physician.
Vicente G. Vérez Bencomo (born 1953). Cuban chemist and scientist.

Czech Republic 
 Marie Chatardová (born 1963). Czech Ambassador to France (2010–2016). Commander.
 Tomáš Prouza (born 1973). Czech State Secretary for EU Affairs (2014–2017). Chevalier.
 Kateřina Šimáčková (born 1966). Czech Constitutional Court judge (2013–2021). Chevalier.

Egypt
 Mahmoud Fakhry Pasha, ambassador of Egypt to France

Chevalier
 Hazem Al Beblawi, Egyptian economist
 Abdel Fattah el-Sisi, Egyptian President
 Mona Zulficar, Egyptian lawyer

Estonia 
Grand Cross
Konstantin Päts (1938), Estonian politician
Lennart Meri (2001), Estonian politician, writer and film director

Grand Officer
Karl Robert Pusta, Estonian diplomat
Toomas Hendrik Ilves (2001), Estonian politician
Siim Kallas (2001), Estonian politician
Jüri Luik (2001), Estonian politician, Estonian Minister of Defence 1999-2002

Commander
Johan Laidoner (1925), Estonian general and statesman
Kristiina Ojuland (2001), Estonian politician
Martin Herem (2021), Estonian general, Commander of the Estonian Defence Forces since 2018

Officer
Oskar Öpik (1937), Estonian diplomat
Ain Kaalep (2001), Estonian poet, playwright and translator
Riho Terras (2013), Estonian politician and former military officer

Chevalier
Philippe Jean-Charles Jourdan (2008)
Arvo Pärt (2011), Estonian composer
Rein Oja (2016), Estonian actor, stage director and theatre leader

Georgia 
Chevalier Grand-Croix de la Légion d'Honneur
 Mikheil Saakashvili, former president of Georgia.
Chevalier
 Bidzina Ivanishvili, Georgian politician, businessman, philanthropist and former Prime Minister of Georgia.

Germany and German Empire 
Grand Cross
 Wilhelm I, the only German ever awarded the Grand Cross before Angela Merkel was Wilhelm I, who received it for saving numerous soldiers' lives during the war with his decisive actions. On one occasion, Wilhelm decided to delay the bombardment in the German siege of Paris, which led to significantly less casualties than an earlier bombardment would have caused. Additionally, during the Paris Commune, Wilhelm led German troops to assist in suppressing the revolt and relayed German medical knowledge to French doctors, enabling them to treat otherwise mortal wounds.
 Angela Merkel
Commandeur
 Peter Altmeier
 Hartmut Bagger
 Manfred Rommel, son of Field Marshal Erwin Rommel and Mayor of Stuttgart from 1974 to 1996. Worked hard to build and maintain good relations between France and Germany several decades after World War II.
Officier
 Rudolf Mößbauer
 Hinrich Seidel
 Jörg Rüdiger Siewert
 Paul Spiegel
 Richard Strauss, conductor and leading composer of the early modern era, awarded the Croix d'Officier (Officer's Cross) on 14 June 1914. Previously awarded the Croix de Chevalier (Knight's Cross) in 1907.
 Margarethe von Trotta
Chevalier
 Peter von Cornelius
 Christoph Eschenbach
 Peter Stein
 Heinrich Strobel, musicologist (1957) appointed Chevalier for his support and promotion of New Music.
 Stephan Toscani

Greece 
Chevalier
 Ilias Lalaounis, pioneer of Greek jewelry and an internationally renowned goldsmith
 Spyridon Flogaitis, professor of public law at the University of Athens and former judge
 Marianna Vardinoyannis, UNESCO ambassador and head of the Elpida (Hope) Children's Oncology Hospital in Athens
 Dora Bakoyannis, Greek politician
 Yiannis Boutaris, Mayor of Thessaloniki, businessman, winemaker

Hong Kong 
Anson Chan (2009), served as the former Chief Secretary, the second highest position in the Hong Kong Government, both before and after the transfer of sovereignty, recognized for her distinguished career and her major contribution to the promotion of gender equality, freedom of press and democratic debate, values of universal significance
Wong Kar Wai (2006), director, was accorded the Chevalier de la Légion d'honneur
Carrie Lam (2015), for her longstanding support for French presence in Hong Kong, as well as for the friendship between France and Hong Kong.
John Slosar (2015), former CEO and Chairman of Cathay Pacific, was bestowed the Chevalier de la Légion d'honneur

India 

Grand Cross

Grand Officer

Commander

Officer

Knight

S. R. Rana (1951), Indian political activist
Sivaji Ganesan, First Indian Actor, Marlon Brando of India 1995
Nallam Venkataramayya medical surgeon and director of Clinic Nallam
Zubin Mehta (2001), a conductor
Alarmel Valli (2004), (India), Bharatanatyam dancer
C. N. R. Rao (2005), a chemist and Head of the Scientific Advisory Council to the Prime Minister of India
E. Sreedharan (2005), (India), Metro Man, Konkan Railway, Delhi Metro, Kochi Metro and Other Related Rail Developments
G. R. Gopinath (2006),  Founder and Chairman of Air Deccan.
Nadir Godrej (2008), Industrialist and managing director of Godrej Industries
N. S. Ramanuja Tatacharya (2012), Sanskrit scholar, author and researcher
Madeleine Herman de Blic (2013), social worker and humanist, Volontariat
Anjali Gopalan (2013), Executive Direcrrtor, The Naz Foundation India Trust, Advocate for LGBT rights and children and mothers living with HIV
Shahrukh Khan (2014), actor, producer
Manish Arora (2016), Punjabi fashion designer
Raja Mohan (2016), academic, journalist and foreign policy analyst
Kamal Haasan (2016), Tamil actor, dancer, film director, screenwriter, producer, playback singer, lyricist and politician (Party in Tamil Nadu-Makkal Needhi Maiam)
Soumitra Chatterjee (2017), Bengali actor
Azim Premji (2018), Founder and Chairman of Wipro Limited & Azim Premji Foundation
A. S. Kiran Kumar (2019)
S.R.Sundaram Kalachuvadu kannan (2022)
Shashi Tharoor
Shashank Subramanyam,(2022) renowned Flute Artist, Indian Classical Music

Iran
Ali Amini (1962), former prime minister; Grand Croix
Bahram Aryana (1966), former Chief of Staff of the Armed Forces; Grand Officer
Safi Asfia, engineer and statesman; Commandeur
Amir-Abbas Hoveyda (After his execution in 1979), former prime minister; Commandeur
 Mohammad Gharib (1954), pediatrician
Shirin Ebadi (2006), human rights lawyer
Ahmad Nafisi (1962), mayor of Tehran
Mohsen Rais, (1947), ambassador and cabinet minister, Grand Officer
Ali-Akbar Siassi, Iranian intellectual, psychologist and politician, Commandeur.
Nasrine Seraji (2011), architect
 Gholam Hossein Amirkhani (2017), calligrapher

Ireland 
 *Patrick James Smyth, Irish revolutionary and politician. Smyth was made a Chevalier in 1871 in recognition of his efforts organising an Irish ambulance service who aided the French Army during the Franco-Prussian War of 1870.   
Joseph O'Kelly (1828–1885), Franco-Irish composer and pianist, "Chevalier" in 1881
Henri O'Kelly (1859–1938), Franco-Irish composer and church musician, "Chevalier" in 1931
Edward Westby Donovan, who fought in the Crimean War, was appointed Chevalier de la Légion d'Honneur
Mary Ryan (15 July 1935), Professor of French at University College Cork, first woman professor on island of Ireland. Awarded the Légion d'Honneur for services to the French language.
Monsignor Professor Brendan Devlin (November 2001) was invested as an Officier de la Légion d'Honneur. 
Alan Dukes (2004), former Irish minister and former leader of Fine Gael is an Officier de la Légion d'Honneur
Mary Lawlor (3 July 2014), founder and executive director of human rights organisation Front Line Defenders was awarded the Insignia of Chevalier of the Legion of Honour on behalf of the French government by French Ambassador to Ireland Mr Jean-Pierre Thebault
Martin Naughton, Irish businessman, founder of the Glen Dimplex group, and philanthropist was invested as an Officier de la Légion d'Honneur in November 2016
Barbara Wright (25 September 2019), Professor Emerita of French at Trinity College, Dublin, eminent scholar of French literature and art history, was appointed Chevalier (Knight) de la Légion d'Honneur by French President Emmanuel Macron and awarded the medal by the French Ambassador to Ireland, Stéphane Crouzat.

Israel 

 Binyamin Amirà (1966), mathematician
Aharon Nahmias, Paris, (26 April 1989). Was appointed Chevalier, 10–11 Knesset member, Deputy Speaker of the Knesset and mayor of the city of Safed.
Amos Oz (1997), writer, journalist

Italy 

Corrado Augias (born 1935), Chevalier, 2007. Augias returned the title on 14 December 2020, deeply disappointed by French President Macron giving the same title to Egyptian dictator Abdel Fattah el-Sisi and in solidarity with Giulio Regeni, killed by the Egyptian regime in 2016.
Monica Bellucci (born 1964), Chevalier, 25 November 2016.
Emma Bonino (born 1948), National Order - Officer, 20 March 2009.
Luciana Castellina (born 1929), she returned the title in December 2020, deeply disappointed by French President Macron giving the same title to Egyptian dictator Abdel Fattah el-Sisi and in solidarity with Giulio Regeni, killed by the Egyptian regime in 2016.
Sergio Cofferati (born 1948), he returned the title in December 2020, deeply disappointed by French President Macron giving the same title to Egyptian dictator Abdel Fattah el-Sisi and in solidarity with Giulio Regeni, killed by the Egyptian regime in 2016.
Umberto Eco (1932–2016), Officer in 2003.
Federico Fellini (1920-1993), in 1984.
Giustino Fortunato (1777–1862), was decorated with the Grand Cross
Enrico Letta (born 1966), National Order - Officer, 25 March 2016.
Gianni Letta (born 1935), Chevalier, 2009.
Giovanna Melandri (born 1962), she received the title on 19 September 2003, and returned it in December 2020, deeply disappointed by French President Macron giving the same title to Egyptian dictator Abdel Fattah el-Sisi and in solidarity with Giulio Regeni, killed by the Egyptian regime in 2016.
Fusco Foresto Moggi,(born 1900) Chevalier, anti fascist Grand Master of free masons received the title on 27 May 1935.
Romano Prodi (born 1939), Chevalier, 13 February 2014.
Cesare Romiti (1923–2020), Officer
Rossana Rummo (born 1953), former director of the Institut culturel italien de Paris Institut culturel italien de Paris. She received the title in 2009 and returned it in December 2020, deeply disappointed by French President Macron giving the same title to Egyptian dictator Abdel Fattah el-Sisi and in solidarity with Giulio Regeni, killed by the Egyptian regime in 2016.
Franca Sozzani (1950-2016), Editor-in-chief of Vogue Italia, was made a Knight of the Legion of Honour in March 2012. 
Giuseppe Verdi (1813-1901), Grand-Croix, 1894. 
Alessandro Volta (1745-1827), Chevalier, 26 August 1806

Indonesia 
Soeharto (1921-2008), Grand Croix, President of Indonesia 
Try Sutrisno (born 1935), Commandeur, Vice President of Indonesia
Ali Alatas (1932-2008), Commandeur, Foreign Minister of Indonesia (2003)
Arrmanatha Nasir (born 1971), Commandeur, Indonesian Ambassador to France, Andorra, Monaco, and the UNESCO (2021)

Japan 
Of 1,500 non-French recipients, 1/10 are Japanese
Akihito, the Emperor Emeritus, was appointed Grand Croix
Chiaki Mukai (2015), the first female Asian astronaut, was appointed Chevalier
Mikitani Hiroshi (2014), entrepreneur and founder of Rakuten
Riyoko Ikeda (2009), author of the popular manga series The Rose of Versailles, was appointed Chevalier in 2009.
Kiyoshi Sumiya, was appointed Commandeur in 1994
Toyoda Shoichiro (2005), former chairman of Toyota Motor Corporation, was appointed Commandeur in 1998, Grand Officier in 2005

Jordan 
Awn Al-Khasawneh, former Prime Minister of Jordan, former judge and vice-president of the International Court of Justice, Grand Officier.
Abdullah Ensour, economist who was Prime Minister of Jordan between October 2012 and May 2016; has held various cabinet positions in Jordanian government in addition to being prime minister
Dina Kawar, a binational Jordanian diplomat who was the ambassador of Jordan to France in 2003

Kuwait 
Hamad Al-Hamad, banker and philanthropist.
 Lulwah Al-Qatami, educator and activist, first woman from Kuwait to attend university overseas, Nobel Peace Prize nominee, former Director of the Women's College of Kuwait University.

Lebanon 
Fairuz, (1998 and 2020) singer.
Jamil Al Sayyed, (Commandeur; 2002) Major General, former Director General of the General Directorate of General Security and current Member of Parliament.
Adnan Kassar, businessman, former head of International Chamber of Commerce (ICC) and former cabinet minister
Nawaf Salam, diplomat.
Rafic Eido, diplomat
Saad Hariri, (2007) politician
Ziyad Baroud, (officier; 2011) former Minister of Interior and Municipalities and prominent civil society activist
May Arida (Knight, 1978), supporter of the arts and international exchange.
Lamia Moubayed Bissat (Knight, 2015)
Melhem Karam (1985), journalist

North Macedonia 
 Nano Ružin (2012) Professor of political sciences, Macedonian Ambassador to NATO and presidential candidate of the Liberal Democratic Party of Macedonia (LDP) in 2009.
 Luan Starova, (2017), writer, translator, diplomat

Malaysia 
 Admiral Mohammad Anwar Mohammad Nor, Chief of Defence Force of Malaysia (2007)
Mizan Zainal Abidin of Terengganu (2010), 13th King of Malaysia, was appointed Commander of the National Order of the Legion of Honour 
Ambiga Sreenevasan (2011), a Malaysian lawyer who served as the President of the Malaysian Bar Council. 
Michelle Yeoh (2007, 2012), a Hong Kong-based Malaysian actress, dancer, and model. Awarded Chevalier in 2007 for contributions of films and media, and appointed Officer and Chevalier in 2012 and 2017 respectively
Sharafuddin of Selangor (2012), 9th Sultan of Selangor, was appointed Commander of the National Order of the Legion of Honour.
Tony Fernandes (2013), co-founder of budget airline AirAsia, was appointed Commander of the National Order of the Legion of Honour
Marina Mahathir (2016), Malaysian socio-political activist and writer, was conferred the Chevalier de la Légion d’Honneur by the French government for "her voice and charisma to many causes", citing her work with the Malaysian AIDS Council and with migrants
Admiral Ahmad Kamarulzaman, Chief of Royal Malaysian Navy (2018)

Mauritius 

Grand Officer
 Seewoosagur Ramgoolam (1973) 
Navin Ramgoolam (2006) 
Commander
 Gaëtan Duval (1973)

Mexico 
Grand Officer

 Mariano Francisco Saynez Mendoza (2010), Admiral

Officer

Jorge Armando Barriguete Meléndez (2010), physician

Chevalier
Fernando Ferrari-Pérez (1901), naturalist, photographer, statesman. Ferrari Pérez took part in the effort to modernize his country based on a Positivist view of progress and society. His country's ideological, scientific and intellectual autonomy was tantamount to its objectives. He worked to promote Mexico's new image and status on the American continent and in Europe; particularly in France where, because of professional imperatives, he lived during intermittent periods in two different addresses, both in Paris (32, Rue de Chazelles and 43, Avenue de Saxe). Fernando Ferrari Pérez introduced the Frères Lumière cinématographe patent into México. The purchase document (in Frères Lumière paperhead) of the patent's franchise for México, is deposited in the 'Archivio Storico della città di Mantova' (Italy). 
The precise reference for his award is: Republique Française – Ordre National de Légion d' Honneur – Président de la Republique Motivation: Ingegneur de Mines. Date: Decret du 3 July 1901. Vu, sélle et enregistré 19 April 1901. Décoration de Chevalier of 'Ordre National de Légion d' Honneur.

Chevalier
Manuel Mondragón, General.
María Félix (1996), actress
Jesús Kumate Rodríguez, physician
Jorge Armando Barriguete Meléndez (2002), physician
Guadalupe Loaeza (2003), writer. 
Jacobo Zabludovsky (2004), journalist
Salma Hayek (2012), actress
Mario J. Molina (2012), chemist
Carmen Aristegui (2012), journalist
Bernardo Gómez-Pimienta (2007)
Octavio Paredes López (2013)
Gabriela Cuevas (2017)

Morocco 

Grand Cross
 Thami El Glaoui (1925), better known in English-speaking countries as T'hami El Glaoui or Lord of the Atlas, was the Pasha of Marrakech from 1912 to 1956
 Mohammed Triki (1936–present),the first Vice Admiral of the modern Royal Moroccan Navy, who held the position as the Commander in Chief for 14 years from 1991 to 2005, and devoted 46 years of services to the Moroccan Navy. Studied at the École de Guerre of Paris and Newport, FL.

Nepal 

Grand Cross
King Tribhuvan of Nepal (1954)
King Mahendra of Nepal (1956)
King Birendra of Nepal (1983)
Maharaja Chandra Shamsher Jang Bahadur Rana, Prime Minister of Nepal (1929; Grand Officer: 1925)
Maharaja Juddha Shamsher Jang Bahadur Rana, Prime Minister of Nepal (1934)
Maharaja Mohan Shamsher Jang Bahadur Rana, Prime Minister of Nepal (1949)
Maharajkumar Shanker Shamsher Jang Bahadur Rana, Ambassador to France (1949)

Grand Officer
Maharajkumar Kaiser Shumsher Jang Bahadur Rana, Director-General of Foreign Affairs (1934)

Netherlands 
Grand Cross
Willem-Alexander of the Netherlands (2014), King of the Netherlands
Joseph Luns (1954), diplomat, Dutch Minister of Foreign Affairs and the 5th Secretary General of NATO. 
Carel Hendrik Ver Huell (1806), Dutch (and later French) admiral who served in the Napoleonic Wars 

Commander
Hans van Mierlo (1999), Dutch politician, Minister of Defence, Minister of Foreign Affairs, Deputy Prime Minister and founder of Democrats 66 

Officer
David Hendrik Chassé (1830/1832), Dutch generaal
Hella Haasse (2000), Dutch writer 
Ernst Hirsch Ballin (2014), Dutch politician, Minister of Justice and Minister of the Interior and Kingdom Relations 
Maria van der Hoeven (2008), Dutch politician and executive director of the International Energy Agency 
Leo van Wijk (2005), Dutch executive, and former president and CEO of KLM and vice-chairman of Air France-KLM 

Chevalier

Geert Mak (2009), Dutch journalist and a non-fiction writer 
Winy Maas (2011), Dutch architect and Urban planner

New Zealand 
Grand Officer
 William Fergusson Massey (1921), Prime Minister of New Zealand from 1912 to 1925, appointed Grand Officier in recognition of New Zealand's contribution during World War I

Commander
Sir Francis Dillon Bell KCMG CB MLC (1889), New Zealand politician and representative at the 1889 Paris World fair and exhibition
Lieutenant Colonel James Waddell (1920), New Zealand born officer in the French Foreign Legion during World War I. Appointed Chevalier in 1915, and Officier in 1917
Air Marshal Sir Charles Roderick Carr KBE, CB, DFC, AFC (1945), for service as Deputy Chief of Staff (Air) Allied Supreme Headquarters France during World War II
Sir Archibald McIndoe CBE FRCS (1946) pioneering New Zealand plastic surgeon who worked for the Royal Air Force rehabilitating badly burned aircrew during World War II
Jean Robertson McKenzie CBE (1956), New Zealand diplomat and first chargé d'affaires to the newly opened New Zealand diplomatic post in Paris
Air Chief Marshal Sir Denis Hensley Fulton Barnett GCB CBE DFC (1958), for service as Commander of the Allied Air Task Force for Operation Musketeer during the 1956 Suez Crisis

Officer
Thomas William Hislop (1889), New Zealand politician and representative at the 1889 Paris World fair and exhibition
Sir Walter Lawry Buller  (1889), New Zealand politician, naturalist and ornithologist who displayed at the 1889 Paris World fair and exhibition
Major General George Napier Johnston CB CMG DSO (1917), New Zealand Army officer and Commander New Zealand Division Artillery in France during World War I
Major General Sir William Livingston Hatchwell Sinclair-Burgess KBE CB CMG DSO (1917), a New Zealand Army Officer attached to the Australian Army Artillery in France during World War I
Major General Sir Andrew Hamilton Russell KCB  (1919), New Zealand Army officer and Commander of the New Zealand Division on the Western Front during World War I
Colonel Sir James Allen GCMG KCB (1922) New Zealand Minister of Defence during World War I
Air Marshal Sir Arthur "Mary" Coningham KCB KBE DSO MC DFC AFC (1943) for service as Air Officer Commanding-in-Chief 2nd Tactical Air Force in France during World War II
Nancy Wake AC GM (1988), New Zealand born member of the French Resistance and Special Operations Executive during World War II. Appointed Chevalier in 1970
Professor John Dunmore CMNZ (2007), prominent New Zealand academic, author on French history in the Pacific and long-time president of the New Zealand Federation des Alliances Francaises

Chevalier
Jean Michel Camille Malfroy(1889), New Zealand representative at the 1889 Paris World fair and exhibition. 
Major General Robert Young KCB CMG DSO (1916), New Zealand Army officer in recognition of services on Gallipoli
Major Norman Frederick Hastings DSO (1916), New Zealand Army officer in recognition of services on Gallipoli
Major General Sir George Spafford Richardson KBE (1916), New Zealand Army officer attached to the Royal Navy Division on Gallipoli
Major Thomas Broun (1917), believed to be belated award for relief of the besieged French Settlement at Pondicherry during the Indian Mutiny in 1857.
Brigadier General Robert O'Hara Livesay CMG DSO (1917), British Army officer attached to the New Zealand Division on the Western Front during World War I
Lieutenant James Lloyd Findlay MC (1917), New Zealand officer with the East Surrey Regiment on the Western Front during World War I
Lieutenant Colonel Cuthbert Trelawder MacLean DSO MC (1918), a New Zealand Royal Flying Corps and Royal Air Force officer during World War I
Lieutenant Colonel Charles Hellier Davies Evans DSO (1919), Commander of the New Zealand Cyclist Corps on the Western Front during World War I
Brigadier James Hargest CBE DSO & 2 bars MC ED MP (1919), New Zealand Army officer on the Western Front during World War I
Colonel Robert Logan CB (1919), New Zealand Army officer and Administrator of Samoa during World War I in "recognition of valuable services"
Colonel Sir Robert Heaton Rhodes KCVO KBE VD (1920), New Zealand politician and special commissioner to the Red Cross during World War I
Major General Alfred William Robin KCMG CB (1922), Commandant of New Zealand Military Forces during World War I
John Alexander (1934), President of the Auckland Branch of the Navy League and host of French Warship visits to Auckland
George William Hutchison (1934), Mayor of Auckland City and host to French Naval visits to Auckland
Bishop Francis William Mary Redwood (1934), Roman Catholic Archbishop of Wellington, Metropolitan of New Zealand
Miss Jean Gardner Batten CBE OSC (1936), New Zealand aviator
Commander Charles Henry Tarr Palmer (1938), President of the Auckland Branch of the Navy League of New Zealand and host to French Warship visits
Sir Ernest Hyam Davies (1938), Mayor of Auckland City and host to French Naval visits to Auckland
Bishop James Michael Liston CMG (1938) Roman Catholic Bishop of Auckland during the centenary of the Catholic Church in New Zealand
Sir Carrick Hey Robertson (1938), Chief Medical Officer of the Mater Misericordiae Hospital of Auckland during the centenary of the Catholic Church in New Zealand
Doctor William Marshall MacDonald CBE (1939), President of the Wellington French Club (subsequently the Alliance Française)
Air Vice Marshal William Vernon "Bill" Crawford-Crompton CB CBE DSO & Bar DFC & Bar (1944), New Zealand-born pilot and air ace of the Second World War
Wing Commander Lloyd Julius Joel DFC & Bar (1945), RAF Operations Staff concerned with the Special Air operations that dropped agents and saboteurs into France during World War II
Patrick Joseph Twomey (1956), New Zealand marist brother and Member Leper Trust Board, who devoted his life in service of Lepers and in the South West Pacific.
Doctor Roy Granville McElroy CMG (1970), Honorary Consular Agent of France in Auckland from 1948 to 1972.
Doctor Leslie Cecil Lloyd Averill (1973), first up the ladder during the liberation of Le Quesnoy in 1918, in commemoration of World War I
Bright Ernest Williams (1998), New Zealand veteran of the Western Front in commemoration of the 80th anniversary of the end of World War I
Professor Darrell Tryon (2004), New Zealand born Professor of Linguistics Emeritus in the Research School of Pacific and Asian Studies at the Australian National University in Canberra. 
Squadron Leader John Gordon Pattison DSO DFC (2004), New Zealand World War II fighter pilot in commemoration of the 60th anniversary of the Normandy landings
Dame Fiona Judith Kidman DNZM OBE (2009) New Zealand novelist, poet, scriptwriter and short story author
Te Rongotoa "Tia" Barrett (2011), New Zealand diplomat to French territories in the Pacific
Nadine Plet (2008)
Phyllis (Pippa) Latour Doyle (2014)
James Arthur Jerram (1998) CAMPAIGN: Egyptian & Egyptian EF & Western European.

Nigeria 

 Sunny A. Olu Jegede was a Nigerian oil executive, industrialist and businessman, awarded in 2010.
 Mike Adenuga is a Nigerian billionaire businessman, and the third richest person in Africa, awarded in 2018.
 Phillip Asiodu is a Nigerian politician.

Norway 
Grand-Croix
Haakon VII of Norway 
Harald V of Norway 
Olav V of Norway 

Grand Officer
Claus Helberg 
Otto Ruge 

Commander
Arne Dagfin Dahl 
Thorbjørn Jagland 

Officer
Theodor Broch 
Col. Birger Eriksen, for the Battle of Drøbak Sound in 1940 during World War II
Ole Henrik Moe 

Chevalier
Eyvind Hellstrøm Norwegian chef and former owner of a two-Michelin-starred restaurant in the city of Oslo. He receaved the honor because he has been positive about France for a long time and promoted the country and it's culture and been an advocate for French values through his work as chef and a number of books written. The award was handed out by word renowned chef Paul Bocuse in 2007 
Asbjørn Aarnes Hans Reidar Holtermann 
Kristian Løken 
Thorvald Nilsen 
Arne Sunde 
Odd Isaachsen Willoch 
Salem Rahmoun Cheniti 
Stål Heggelund

Pakistan 
 Saeed Akhtar Malik, former Naval Officer, former Secretary to the President of Pakistan, former Director For Regional Bureau of Eastern Europe WFP(World Food Programme) current leader of Bright Star Mobile Library (BSML).
 Ahmad Hasan Dani, intellectual, archaeologist, historian, and linguist, awarded in 1998
Asma Jahangir, prominent Pakistani legal expert and human rights activist, awarded in 2014
Nawab Ashiq Hussain Qureshi, cricketer, Honorary French Consul General in Lahore 2008–2018.
Muhammad Amjad Khan Niazi, Admiral and current Chief of Naval Staff of the Pakistan Navy
Rao Qamar Suleman, Air Chief Marshal, Chief of Air Staff, (Pakistan Air Force)2009-2012.

Panama 
 Roberto Roy, Minister of Canal Affairs of Panama

Paraguay 
Commander
 Francisco Solano López, Military and Statesman. Awarded by Napoleón III in 1854 for eminent merits.
Chevalier
 Augusto Roa Bastos, writer.

Philippines 

Grand-Croix
Corazon C. Aquino, president
Teodoro Benigno, journalist
Jose de Venecia, Jr., Speaker of the House of Representatives
Manuel L. Quezon, President of the Commonwealth of the Philippines
Fidel V. Ramos, President
Carlos P. Romulo, Minister of Foreign Affairs

Grand Officer
Elpidio Quirino, President

Commander
Leticia Ramos-Shahani, Senator

Officer
Basilio Valdes, Secretary of National Defense
Arsenio Luz (1932), Director-General of the Philippine Carnival, businessman, and representative of the Philippines at the 1931 Paris Colonial Exposition

Chevalier
Pura Santillan-Castrence, writer and diplomat
Romulo Espaldon, rear admiral and diplomat
Loren Legarda, Senator
Max Soliven, journalist
Bernardo Sim, francophile
Roberto de Ocampo, Secretary of Finance

Poland 

More than 400 Poles have received the award. Among the most notable "historic" recipients:
 Roman Abraham
 Wladyslaw Anders, WWII general
 Count Xavier Branicki, financier and patron of the arts, philanthropist
 Tomasz Lubienski, officer in Napoleon's army
 Aleksander Piotr Mohl, diplomat
 Józef Poniatowski, who fought under Napoleon until his own death, unlike many of Napoleon's friends left him when he lost power

Portugal 
 Francisco Manuel de Melo Breyner, 4th Count of Ficalho, Chevalier of the Légion d'Honneur
 António Cabreira, scholar, was awarded the Chevalier of the Légion d'Honneur by decree of 8 January 1903
 António Egas Moniz, Commandeur of the Légion d'Honneur
 Alberto Girard, Officier of the Légion d'Honneur
 Aníbal Milhais, Soldier in World War 1 was awarded the Chevalier of the Légion d'honneur on the battlefield

Qatar 
 Abdullah bin Nasser Al Thani, 19 November 2009
 Jassim Saif Al Sulaiti, Qatari Minister of Transport

Romania 
Romanian royal family
 King Ferdinand I – Knight Grand Cross
 Queen Marie – Dame Grand Officer (1918)
 Maria, Queen Mother of Yugoslavia – Knight Grand Cross (1959)
 King Michael I – Knight Grand Cross (1944)
 Crown Princess Margareta – Knight (2009)

Kingdom of Romania
 General Constantin Prezan –  Grand Officer (1917)

Republic of Romania
 President Nicolae Ceaușescu – Honorary Knight Grand Cross (revoked)
Corneliu Coposu – Grand Officer (1995)

Russia 
 Osip Komissarov, peasant-born hatter's apprentice, for saving Alexander II (1866) 
 Lazar Brodsky, businessman and philanthropist (1900) 
 L. L. Zamenhof, physician, creator of Esperanto (1905) 
 Ivan Poddubny, professional wrestler (1911) 
 Rodion Malinovsky, a Soviet military commander in World War II and Defense Minister of the Soviet Union in the 1950s and 1960s (1945, Grand Officer)
 Maya Plisetskaya, ballerina (1986) 
 Nikita Mikhalkov, actor and director (Officer in 1992, Commander in 1994) 
 Gennady Rozhdestvensky, conductor (2003) 
 Lyudmila Alexeyeva, human rights activist (2007) 
 Anatoly Perminov, rocket scientist (2010) 
 Vladimir Spivakov, violinist and conductor (Chevalier in 2000, Officer in 2011) 
 Mikhail Gromov, pilot, air forces commander
 Aleksandr Ivanchenkov, cosmonaut 
 Irina Antonova, Director of the Pushkin Museum 
 Aleksandr Viktorenko, cosmonaut 
 Yury Osipov, mathematician 
 Yevgeniy Chazov, physician 
 Zhores Alferov, physicist 
 Mikhail Piotrovsky, Director of the State Hermitage Museum 
 Pavel Lungin, director 
 Viatcheslav Moshe Kantor, Jewish leader, philanthropist and businessman 
 Sergei Kovalev, human rights activist 
 Vladimir Putin, president of the Russian Federation (2006)

Saudi Arabia
 Prince Muhammad bin Nayef (2016)

Serbia 
King Peter I, King of Serbia, was awarded Grand Cross and became the ruler of the new country: Kingdom of Serbs, Croats and Slovenes (later renamed Kingdom of Yugoslavia) 
Veran Matić (2009), Serbian journalist and editor-in-chief of B92, "for the fight he has always led for independence and freedom of the media"
Emir Kusturica (2011), Yugoslav, Serbian and Bosnian filmmaker (born in 1954, in Sarajevo, former Yugoslavia now Bosnia), was appointed Chevalier of the Légion d'Honneur
Dragoljub Mićunović (2013), Serbian politician, philosopher, "for building democracy", was appointed Officer of the Légion d'Honneur
Olja Bećković (2014), Serbian journalist, actress and television presenter for "her exceptional professional path, courage, and fearlessness"
Alexander, Crown Prince of Serbia (2015), Crown Prince of Serbia, "for his contribution in democratization of Serbian society", was awarded Commandeur of the Légion d'Honneur
Čedomilj Mijatović, Serbian ambassador, politician and academic
Veselin Čajkanović, classical scholar, philosopher, ethnologist, religious history scholar, and Greek and Latin translator.
Milan Kašanin, art historian and writer
Pavle Savić, scientist and Nobel Prize candidate
Milunka Savić
Dragutin Gavrilović, military officer
Živojin Mišić, field marshal
Alexander I of Yugoslavia
Predrag Koraksić Corax, political caricaturist
Borka Pavićević, political and NGO activist
Pavle Beljanski, lawyer and diplomat
Alexander, Crown Prince of Yugoslavia was awarded Commandeur in 2015
German, Serbian Patriarch
Sonja Licht, NGO activist
Aleksandar Tišma, writer
Mira Trailović, dramaturg and one of the most distinguished theatre directors in the history of Serbian and Yugoslav theatre
Svetlana Velmar-Janković, writer
Ljubica Gojgić, journalist

Singapore 
Tan Boon Teik (1998), former Attorney-General of Singapore, was appointed an Officer for contributions towards increasing commercial ties between France and Singapore as co-chairman of the France–Singapore Business Council
Su Guaning (2005), President Emeritus of Nanyang Technological University.
Ng Eng Hen (2018), Minister of Defence of Singapore since 2011, appointed Officer
Tan Chorh Chuan (2022), Chief Health Scientist, appointed Knight for outstanding contributions in health and science
Leo Yee Sin (2022), executive director of the National Centre of Infectious Diseases, appointed Knight
Laurient Rénia (2022), Director of the Respiratory and Infectious Diseases Programme at the Lee Kong Chian School of Medicine at Nanyang Technological University, appointed Knight
 Tan Eng Chye (2022), President of the National University of Singapore, appointed Knight

Spain 
 Grand-Croix

 Felipe VI of Spain
 Juan Carlos I of Spain
 Queen Sofía of Spain

 Grand Officer
 Carlos Ibáñez e Ibáñez de Ibero, marquis of Mulhacén, geodesist, first president of the International Committee for Weights and Measures for his contribution in dissemination of the metric system among all nations
 Imeldo Serís-Granier y Blanco in 1885

 Commandeur
 Fernando Alejandre, Chief of the Defence Staff.

 Chevalier
 Isaac Albeniz (composer) (1909)
 Manuel Quiroga, violinist, composer and artist, appointed a Chevalier in 1931

South Korea 
 Grand Officer
 Yang Ho Cho, Chairman of Hanjin Group was awarded in 2015

 Commander
 Lee Kun-Hee, Samsung chief executive officer was awarded in 2006. 

 Chevalier
 Myung-whun Chung, Conductor was awarded the honor in 1992
Song Young-gil, South Korean Politician was the chairman of Parliamentary Friendship Group with the Republic of France from 2004 to 2008
Kim Hong-nam, Former director of the National Museum of Korea was awarded in 2008
Chey Tae-won, Group Chairman of SK and Chairman of the Korean Chamber of Commerce and Industry, awarded in June 2022

Sri Lanka 
 Commander
 Chandrika Kumaratunga

 Officer
 Professor Mohan Munasinghe
 Professor Malik Peiris

Sweden 
 Grand-Croix
  King Carl XVI Gustaf of Sweden, appointed with the Grand Cross
 Queen Silvia of Sweden
 Hjalmar Hammarskjöld
 Arvid Lindman
 Axel Rappe
 Knut Agathon Wallenberg
 Grand Officer
 Carl August Ehrensvärd
 Bengt Nordenskiöld

 Commander
 Carl Bildt
 Fredrik Ramel
 Håkan Syrén
 Officer

 Harald Cramér
 Birgitta Ohlsson, appointed 23 January 2017

 Chevalier
 Max von Sydow
 Rikard Wolff
 Lars Levi Laestadius
 Gunilla Svantorp
Annelie Johansson

Switzerland 
 Charles Morerod, awarded Chevalier de la Légion d'honneur on 17 October 2013
 Elisabeth Eidenbenz, 2017 in Vienna as a Knight of the French Legion of Honor (Legion d'Honneur)
 Guy Demole, awarded Officer de la Légion d'honneur on 20 October 2011

Taiwan
Ang Lee, February 2021.

Thailand 
Grand-Croix
 King Mongkut (1865)
 Prime Minister Pridi Banomyong (1939)
 King Bhumibol Adulyadej (1960)
 Field Marshal Sarit Thanarat
 Field Marshal Thanom Kittikachorn
 Queen Sirikit (1960)
Grand Officer
 Second King Pinklao (1865) ENDS.
 Princess Galyani Vadhana (2007)

Turkey 
İhsan Doğramacı, paediatrician, entrepreneur, philanthropist, educationalist and college administrator, Officier de la Legion d’Honneur (1977).
Leyla Alaton,  businesswoman and art collector, member of the Board of Alarko group of companies, appointed as Chévalier in 2014

United Arab Emirates 
Princess Haya bint Al Hussein (2014)

United Kingdom 

The Légion d'Honneur was awarded to 746 members of the British Armed Forces during the Crimean War, 1854–1856.

 

A–C
Henry Allingham (2003, 2009), the world's oldest man at his death and the second oldest war veteran of all time; appointed Chevalier in 2003 and promoted to Officier in 2009
Lionel Barber, Chevalier de la Légion d'honneur, for European journalism
Thomas Jones Barker (awarded c. 1839), painter to Louis Philippe I
William Guy Batham, Chevalier de la Légion d'honneur, awarded 2020 for services in the liberation of Europe at the D-Day landings
Beecham, Sir Thomas, Commandeur, awarded 1937 for services to French music
Captain Ralph Beauclerk, later Marqués de Valero de Urría, Chevalier de la Légion d'honneur (1945)
General Sir Henry Bentinck, Commandeur de la Légion d'honneur
Lt-Cdr Richard Bevan (1919), for services during the Gallipoli Campaign
Thomas A Bird, DSO, MC & Bar (2004), for leading a Rifle Brigade relief column through enemy lines into the desert citadel of Bir Hakeim, which enabled the 1st Free French Brigade to break out of the German encirclement on the night on 10/11 June 1942.
 Sir Robert Bird, 2nd Baronet, awarded the Chevalier de la Légion d'honneur in 1947
 Annie Brewer was awarded the Legion d'honneur and the Croix de Guerre for service as a nurse with the French Red Cross in WW1
Alan Burns, 4th Baron Inverclyde, Commandeur de la Légion d'honneur
 George Callaghan (1918), Admiral of the Fleet, appointed a Grand Officier of the Order
Edward Cavendish, 10th Duke of Devonshire, Chevalier de la Légion d'honneur
George Lenthal Cheatle, Chevalier de la Légion d'honneur (1935)
The 1st Marquess of Cholmondeley, Chevalier de la Légion d'honneur
Sean Connery Commandeur, actor
Sir John Henry Corke, Chevalier de la Légion d'honneur for his war work during World War I 
Major Benjamin Cowburn, MC (and Bar), Croix de Guerre, appointed Chevalier de la Légion d'honneur
Bill Cross (2015), British Army soldier who fought in Normandy in the days after D-Day
Ron Cross (2016), British Army soldier who was part of the 79th Armoured Division, one of the first to land on Juno Beach during the Normandy landings

D–J
 John Edward Davis British Army (1998), appointed Chevalier for service during the First World War alongside other remaining survivors including Harry Patch, was one of the last surviving combatants and the last Kitchener Volunteer to die. 
 Maurice Edelman MP, promoted Officier of the Légion d'honneur in 1960, having been appointed Chevalier in 1954
Lieutenant Colonel (Temp. Brigadier General) William Rushbrooke Eden, appointed Officier in 1917 for services on the Macedonian Front.
Major-General Sir David Egerton, Chevalier de la Légion d'honneur (1945);
Albert Edward England (2015), appointed Chevalier de la Légion d'honneur for his role during the Normandy D-Day landings.
Captain Stanley Frederick English. Chevalier de la Legion d’honneur. 1947: for services to France 1940/1946.
Stoker/2nd Writer Clerk Eric Peter Molyneux (2021), Appointed Chevalier (Knight) de la Légion d'honneur on 1 April 2021, for his role on D-Day, serving on board HMS Prince Charles (1941) with the Merchant Navy. His ship took the US 2nd Rangers to Omaha on the morning of 6 June 1944.
Noble Frankland (2016), appointed Chevalier de la Légion d'honneur for his role in flying 27 sorties with 50 Squadron Bomber Command in support of the liberation of France, including two on D-Day
Carey Henrietta Fraser, First Aid Nursing Yeomanry (FANY), appointed Chevalier de la Legion d’honneur, July 1918 while serving with FANY Unit 9 attached to the French Army. Also awarded the Croix de Guerre.
Henry Fynes Clinton, Officier de la Légion d'honneur;
Douglas Gordon, appointed Commandeur de la Légion d'honneur;
Graham Greene (1967), appointed Chevalier de la Légion d'honneur
Sir Douglas Haig, appointed Grand Officier in May 1915 and Grand Croix in February 1916 
Sir Amos Hirst (1953), Chairman of the Football Association (FA), awarded to celebrate the FA's 90th Anniversary
Lieutenant Colonel Godfrey William Vanrenen Holdich. Chevalier de la Légion d'honneur.
Lieutenant Colonel Ewart Horsfall, Chevalier for activity in Royal Flying Corps in 1916, businessman and Olympic rower
Alan David Iles, Royal Navy, appointed to the rank of Chevalier in the Ordre national de la Legion d’honneur by the President of the Republic in recognition of his military engagement and steadfast involvement in the liberation of France during the Second World War.
Sir Elton John (2019), was made Chevalier de la Légion d'honneur by French President Emmanuel Macron
 Sir Gladwyn Jebb (1957), 1st Baron Gladwyn, Grand Croix de la Légion d'honneur

K–P
Kenneth Wilson 1924–2021, Army number 2991806. Appointment the rank of Chevalier in the Ordre national de la Legion d’honneur by degree of 27 January 2018 by Jean-Pierre Jouyet. To recognise Kenneth's military engagement and steadfast involvement in the Liberation Of France during the Second World War. 
Nasser David Khalili awarded the rank of Officier in the Légion d'honneur by President Francois Hollande for his work in the pursuit of peace, education and culture among nations
John Langdon, Commander of the National Order of the Légion d'honneur, Royal Marine officer at D-Day, later became an Anglican priest
Sir Edward Leigh MP, appointed Officier de la Légion d'honneur in 2015;
Major Gerald Loxley , appointed Chevalier de la Légion d'honneur in 1919
Darnton Lupton, Mayor of Leeds 1844
Sir Paul McCartney  (2012), was invested as Officier of the Légion d'honneur by President François Hollande
Admiral Francis Mitchell, in recognition of military service during WWI
Lord Monks (2014), former General-Secretary of the Trades Union Congress 1993–2003, Secretary-General of the European Trade Union Confederation 2003–2011
Colonel Sir Thomas Andrew Alexander Montgomery-Cuninghame, 10th Baronet, awarded the Légion d'honneur in 1919 by the President of the French Republic
Christopher Nevinson, artist, awarded Chevalier of the Légion d'honneur in 1938
Chris Norman (2015), for subduing the gunman of the 2015 Thalys train attack
Joseph Heber Owen (1921 - 2021), appointed Chevalier on 27 May 2016 for steadfast involvement in the liberation of France 
Percy Sydney Edward Page (1924-2022) military veteran, appointed Chevalier on 9 October 2017 for steadfast involvement in the liberation of France and presented by Jean-Pierre Jouyet on behalf of the President of France. 
Harry Patch (1998, 2009), Britain's last surviving First World War Veteran, appointed Chevalier 1998 and promoted Officier in 2009

Q–V
 Jim Radford, appointed Chevalier of the Légion d'honneur in October 2015 "in recognition of his steadfast involvement in the Liberation of France during the Second World War" (Britain's youngest Normandy Veteran was a fifteen year old seaman on the Empire Larch; one of the Deep Sea Tugs that built the breakwater for the Mulberry Harbour at Arromanches)
 J. K. Rowling, awarded the Légion d'honneur by French President Nicolas Sarkozy in 2009;
 Dame Kristin Scott Thomas, Chevalier de la Légion d'honneur;
  Major Robert Spencer MC Royal Tank Corps Chevalier de la Legion d'honneur 3rd June 1919  
 Sydney Vincent Sippe (1914), pilot, raid on German Zeppelin factory in November 1914
 Lord Slynn of Hadley , Chevalier de la Légion d'honneur;
The 12th Duke of St Albans, Chevalier de la Légion d'honneur;
Vice-Admiral Sir Victor Stanley, Chevalier de la Légion d'honneur;
James H. Sutherland, appointed Chevalier of the Légion d'honneur, for conspicuously good service as Special Guide to the Nyasaland Field Force.
Sir John Sulston, (2004) Officier de la Legion d'honneur;
Susan Travers (1996); Served in the French Red Cross as a nurse and ambulance driver during Second World War. She later became the only woman to officially join the French Foreign Legion, and served in Vietnam, during the First Indochina War. 
Violet Trefusis (1950), writer and socialite, appointed Chevalier de la Légion d'honneur;
Ninette de Valois (1950), appointed Chevalier of the Légion d'honneur

W–Z
Air Chief Marshal Sir Augustus Walker, WWII Pilot, also awarded also the Croix de Guerre. Played Rugby for England. He held the post of Inspector-General of the RAF from 1964 to 1966 when he became Deputy Commander-in-Chief Allied Forces Central Europe.
Sir Herbert Ashcombe Walker, General Manager of the London and South Western Railway, appointed a Grand Officier of the Légion d'honneur
Arthur Wallis-Myers, English tennis correspondent, editor, author and player. Appointed Chevalier of the Legion of Honour by French President Paul Doumer on 29 April 1932 for his service to the game of tennis.
Herbert Ward, sculptor, was awarded the Légion d'honneur in 1911, after twice winning the Gold Medal of the Salon des Artistes Français
The 8th Duke of Wellington KG, Officier de la Légion d'honneur;
Sir Frank Williams, founder of the Williams F1 Team, appointed Chevalier of the Légion d'honneur
Winder, Captain A.J.H., Royal Signals (attached to 90th Field Regiment Royal Artillery), 50th Division. 
Wing Commander Forest Frederick Edward Yeo-Thomas, British Special Operations Executive agent codenamed "The White Rabbit", was presented with the Commandeur of the Légion d'honneur on the personal instructions of President Charles de Gaulle

United States

Individuals 
The individuals listed below are among the approximately 10,000 Americans who have been so honored:

A–B

Brett August (2015), founder French-American Chamber of Commerce Chicago; Chair, Chicago-Paris Sister Cities Committee; founder, Chicago chapter of l'Ordre des Canardiers.  

Frank Lusk Babbott, philanthropist
Josephine Baker, an entertainer, activist, and French Resistance agent
 James Baldwin (1986), African-American author and commentator who expatriated to France in 1948 where he remained for the rest of his life. He died at his home in Saint-Paul-de-Vence in 1987.
 John William Barker (1920), U.S. Army brigadier general
 Alexander Graham Bell (1847) inventor of the telephone
 Jeff Bezos (2023), founder of Amazon
 Kathryne Bomberger, director-general of the International Commission on Missing Persons (ICMP) 
 Arnaud de Borchgrave (2014), journalist specializing in international politics and former editor in chief of The Washington Times. He was awarded in July 2014 with French Ambassador Francois Delattre saying that Borchgrave is "a World War II hero to whom France is eternally grateful, and one of the most remarkable journalists of our lifetime who is also a great friend of France and an exceptional individual."
John Nicholas Brown Philanthropist
Eugene Bullard (1959) First African-American military pilot, Lafayette Flying Corps WWI
Benjamin Crowninshield Bradlee (2007), received it for being the Press Attache of News Week in Paris.
Charles H. Burke (1932) Congressman, Commissioner of the Bureau of Indian Affairs, and representative of the U.S. mainland for the 1931 Paris Colonial Exposition
Rear Admiral Richard E. Byrd (Chevalier 1926), (Commandeur 1929)  Leader of the first flights over the North Pole and South Pole

C–D

Julia Child (November 2000)
Steven Clemons, Chevalier (October 2021) American journalist, editor, foreign policy expert for his contributions in the field of foreign affairs and international diplomacy.
Bette Davis film actress.
Miles Davis jazz musician
Marlene Dietrich German-born actress and singer, for her work improving morale on the front lines of WWII
Walt Disney (8 Jan 1936) cartoonanimator and producer. 
Donald Wills Douglas Jr. American industrialist, for his contributions to aviation
Kirk Douglas (1985) American actor
Charles Durning, European Theater of World War II, also, US Silver Star, US Bronze Star Medal with Valor Device, 3 US Purple Hearts
Bob Dylan (2013) American musician, singer-songwriter, artist, and writer

E
Max S. Eagelfeld (2018) 12th Armored Division, 82nd Armored Medical Battalion, for service during the liberation of Alsace. He also received the Bronze Star, Combat Medical Badge and was inducted into the New York State Veterans Hall of Fame.
Clint Eastwood (2009) American actor, film director, film producer and composer
Dwight D. Eisenhower, Grand-Croix (1943) five-star general in the United States Army, 34th President of the United States, Supreme Commander of the Allied forces in Europe during World War II, and the supreme commander of NATO. Eisenhower received his decoration directly from General Henri-Honoré Giraud who gave him his own. Eisenhower, as promised, did not put it on until the French tricolor flew over the city of Strasbourg in the French region of Alsace
Lambert P. Elbert (2010) Corydon, Indiana Veteran
Muriel Engelman (born Muriel Phillips, 12 January 1921, Meriden CT), second lieutenant, U.S. Army Nurse Corps in World War II, spending several months of her two-year service near the front lines at the Ardennes (Battle of the Bulge) treating American and Allied soldiers. Appointed the Legion of Honor by President Emmanuel Macron in July 2018 and received her medal at the age of 97 in a ceremony in Los Angeles, 20 September 2018, from the Consul General of France for the State of California.

F
Samuel Morse Felton Jr. American railroad executive who was in charge of organization and dispatch to France of all American railway forces and supplies for the Western Front of World War I.
Mayhew Foster (2009) World War II soldier who flew Hermann Göring from Austria to Germany, where Göring stood trial for war crimes at Nuremberg

G

Jeanne Gang (2015), American architect
 Ralph Gibson, American Photographer, appointed Knight of the Order of the Legion of Honor (2018).
Grace Gassette, American artist who designed orthopedic devices for wounded soldiers in World War I
Rick Goings, Chairman Emeritus Tupperware Brands, for his dedication to the role of women and children in developing countries (2010)
Bart Gordon, Officer (2012), US Representative from Tennessee
Alan Greenspan, economist and Chairman of the US Federal Reserve
William Remsburg Grove (Officer 1919), US Army, Quartermaster Corps, for World War I service.

H
Philip Habib, Under Secretary of State for Political Affairs, special envoy to the Middle East
Harry B. Harris Jr. (2018) Commander, U.S. Pacific Command and designated U.S. Ambassador to the Republic of Korea
Stuart Holliday (2022), United States Ambassador for Special Political Affairs at the United Nations (2003-2005)
Thomas E. Horn (2021), Honorary Consul of Monaco in San Francisco
Elias Howe (1867), inventor of the sewing machine
Robert E. Hunter, US Ambassador to NATO
I
Daniel Inouye (2007), US Senator from Hawaii. US Army Captain with the 442nd RCT during World War II

J
Charles Thomas Jackson American physician and scientist who was active in medicine, chemistry, mineralogy, and geology.
Jesse Jackson (2021) American civil rights leader
Quincy Jones (2001) American record producer and musician
Ira Joralemon (1918), American geologist and mining engineer, served on Billy Mitchell's staff in the United States Army Air Service during World War I

K
 Otto Kahn, German-born, American patron of the arts
Bentley Kassal World War II Veteran.
Philip Kearny, was the first American recipient for his service in the Battle of Solferino.
Jeong H. Kim (2013), President of Bell Labs (2005–2013), in recognition of his exceptional accomplishments and exemplary commitment to French-American friendship
Young-Oak Kim, Officier (2005), US Army Colonel; Battalion Operation Officer of the 100th bn/442nd RCT during the campaigns for Bruyères and Biffontaine
Brian Warner Kittrell (Commandeur 1988)  Given due to the extraordinary valor displayed while rescuing American and French government officials from a terrorist car bombing near the embassy in 1988. He was working as an intern at the Paris American Embassy at the age of 16, making him is the youngest  American to be given the honor. 

Jacques Paul Klein, Under-Secretary-General of the United Nations 
Blanche Knopf Officier (1960), American publisher, in recognition of her work publishing French literature
William A. Knowlton, US Army general 
C. Everett Koop (1980), Surgeon General of the United States
Lawrence D. Kritzman (2012) John D. Willard Professor of French, Comparative Literature, and Oratory Dartmouth 

L

Henry Louis Larsen, commander of the 3rd Battalion 5th Marines during World War I and later Governor of Guam
John Leahy, Chief Sales Officer at Airbus was named an Officer of the Order in March 2012
John A. Lejeune, Lieutenant General, U.S. Marine Corps, Commander of 4th Marine Brigade, then U.S. Army 2nd Infantry Division during World War I
Lyman Lemnitzer, US Army General, Supreme Allied Commander for Europe. 
Harold Lewis (2000), 8th Field Engineers, British Infantry while serving with Overseas Military Forces of Canada, World War I
Jerry Lewis (1984) Commandeur (2006)
Charles Lindbergh, American aviator 
James Harvard London, American Engineer 
David Lynch, filmmaker

M
Douglas MacArthur, Grand-Croix. American General, Chief of Staff of the United States Army, and field marshal of the Philippine Army
John F. Madden, U.S. Army brigadier general
Donald Malarkey (2009) U.S. Army, Easy Company, 2nd Battalion, 506th Parachute Infantry Regiment, 101st Airborne Division, U.S. Army
Paul Bernard Malone, U.S. Army general
Fred Marcusa (2014) American business strategist, lawyer, and musician
Wynton Marsalis (2009), (US), an American trumpeter and composer 
George C. Marshall, Grand-Croix. American General Chief of Staff of the United States Army. US Secretary of State, and Secretary of Defense.
Knox Martin, American painter, sculptor and muralist, Chevalier (2016), for his contribution to the liberation of France during World War II.
Paul Goodloe McIntire, American investor and philanthropist, for founding a tuberculosis hospital in France.
Luke McNamee, Admiral, 10th and 12th Naval Governor of Guam, head of the Battle Fleet, and 21st Director of the Office of Naval Intelligence
Richard McNulty of Floral, Arkansas, Chevalier and 5 U.S. Bronze Star Medals, 1st US Army under command of Gen. Omar Bradley, landed on Omaha Beach during the Allied forces (World War II) Invasion of Normandy and pushed with unit to the Rhine valley
William A. McNulty, Chevalier (1945), colonel (US Army), WWII field commander
John Mierzejewski, Chevalier, (2016), private first class (US Army), 29th infantry division, 16th infantry regiment, heavy artillery gunner. Landed on Omaha Beach as part of the second wave of the invasion of Normandy. 
Russell Miller, took part in the D-Day invasion. He was wounded in combat in Normandy in 1944 and in Germany in 1945. Awards include the Purple Heart with one Oak Leaf Cluster. In 2015, Russell was awarded the Legion of Honor by the French Government.
Billy Mitchell, Commandeur. United States Army Air Service Brigadier General.
Toni Morrison (2010) American novelist
Michael Mullen (2007) 17th Chairman of the Joint Chiefs of Staff
Thomas Volney Munson, In 1888 he received decorations of the Legion of Honor with the title "Chevalier du Merite Agricole" for aid to France in viticulture.
Myron H. Murley (2013), Colonel, Infantry (retired), United States Army (b. 4 June 1923, d. 2 September 2013) for his gallant conduct in the liberation of France, 1944.
Audie Murphy, the most decorated US soldier of World War II
Walter Miller, (2015) U.S. Army, 82nd Airborne for combat service on D-Day at St. Mere Eglise where he earned the first of his two Purple Hearts at the age of 17.
James Mynatt (2017) Army Air Corps, 848th Bomb Squadron, 490th Bombardment Group, ultimately flew 35 missions, his first piloting a B-24 bomber over Normandy on D-Day
N
Joseph Napolitan, Political Consultant, awarded in 2005
Chester W. Nimitz, Grand-Croix. US Navy Fleet Admiral – Commander of the U.S. Pacific Fleet during World War II. 
O–Q

 Robert O'Brien (2022) former National Security Advisor, helped free two French hostages
 George Kenichi Ōide "Chevalier" (Knight) (2019) - US Army Private, for his contribution to liberating France from Nazi occupation.
Edgar dePue Osgood, Officer (2006) honorary consul of Côte d'Ivoire, for military service in WWII and keeping the French Language a vibrant entity in the State of California for 50 years.
William "Bill" Bruce Overstreet, Jr. (2009) (US), USAAF, WWII Fighter Pilot, with the 357th FG, 363rd FS. The "Yoxford Boys". Flew a P-51 Mustang named "Berlin Express". Only known Allied fighter pilot to turn in a kill while flying under the "Eiffel Tower" in Paris chasing a German Me-109. Chevalier medal, presented by Ambassador to the US Pierre Vimont at the D-Day Memorial 8_December_2009AD, Bedford, VA US. Vimont said of Bill Overstreet in his speech that the Legion of Honour is "The sign of my country's exceptional recognition of Captain Overstreet's heroic contribution to the liberation of France."
James E. Padesky (2009) United States Air Force first lieutenant in 14th Liaison Squadron, 9th Air Force, assigned to George S. Patton's Third Army in 1944
Vernon Valentine Palmer (2007) professor of law, Tulane University 
Frank Pagliuca (2014) US Army, fought alongside French troops in the Colmar Pocket
Joe Panno (2012) US Army corporal, 29th Division 115th Regiment 3rd Battalion, fought during the liberation of St. Lo
Robert Parker Officier (2005), American wine critic 
Mason Patrick, major general, US Army, and Chief of US Army Air Corps 
George S. Patton, Commandeur. US Army general 
Ernest C. Peixotto, captain/artist, US Army Corps of Engineers – WWI (presented 1921 Chevalier raised to Officer 1926)
Mary Hutchinson Peixotto, artist/American Red Cross – WWI (presented 1921 Chevalier)
Donald A. Peltier (2013) corporal US Army 8th Armored Division, Allied Invasion World War II, Normandy, Belgium, Holland, Germany (Bronze Star for Valor).
Claiborne Pell, United States Senator
Alvin Houston Perry (2019), 331st Infantry Regiment of the 83rd Infantry Division, Prisoner of War (Stalag VII-A in Moosburg Germany), Purple Heart
Joseph Petrucci Chevalier (2016), US Army Engineer 294th Joint Assault Signal Company (JASCO) World War II, American Campaign Medal, European-African-Middle Eastern Campaign Medal with two Bronze Stars and Arrowhead, Asiatic-Pacific Campaign Medal, and Croix de Guerre. Petrucci was wounded in action on D-Day but refused the Purple Heart because he felt accepting it would dishonor those who sacrificed their lives on that historic day. He was awarded this medal for services to France during World War II. Legion of Honor: Ceremony in San FranciscoWWII D-Day veteran, Truckee resident awarded France's Legion of Honor
Lafayette G. Pool, S/Sgt, US Army 3rd Armored Division, US tank ace credited with over 1,000 kills, 250 German prisoners of war taken, 12 confirmed tank kills and 258 total armored vehicle and self-propelled gun kills
Colin Powell, US Secretary of State, US Army General
William Wilson Quinn, US Army Lieutenant general. responsible for the U.S. 7th Army's capture of Hermann Göring, Assistant Chief of Staff of the CIA 
R

Faizel Firoz Alexander Razak (2012) for services rendered towards the French Republic. 
Robert Redford (2010) American actor
Raj Reddy (1984) for his work on artificial intelligence and computer literacy 
James Cooper Rhea (1918) Brigadier General, United States Army. Received the Officer Class of the award, for actions in World War One. Also received the French Croix de Guerre, with palm.
Alexander H. Rice, Jr., Commandeur. Doctor, for his medical services in France during World War I
C. Allen Thorndike Rice (1879) for Charnay Expedition to explore and photograph Mayan ruins in Mexico and Guatemala
John S. Ripandelli (2013) for his World War II service
Charles Rivkin, Commandeur (2013). Current U.S. Assistant Secretary of State for Economic and Business Affairs and former U.S. Ambassador to France
John J. Roach (2017), a United States Army forward artillery observer during World War II
Paul Craig Roberts, Former U.S. Assistant Secretary for Economic Policy
Rufus Roger Roberts, for his services during World War II
Russell M. "Russ", "Buddy" Robinson, Roanoke, VA USA (b. 6 April 1923) 2nd and 1st Lt US Army Air Forces WWII bomber pilot. Captain US Army National Guard 30th Division, North Carolina, helicopter pilot until 1964. In WWII Russell was a combat B-24 Liberator Bomber pilot of the ship "Arrowhead". He flew with the 453rd BG (Heavy), 732nd BS (31 missions); 93rd BG (Heavy), 329th BS (3 missions). French President Emmanuel Macron of France signed to have the Rank of Chevalier (Knight) of the Legion de Honour bestowed upon Mr. Robinson for missions of a humanitarian nature. Russell and crew flew some missions not carrying bombs, but food stuffs/medicine/blankets for the French refugees returning from Denmark/Holland/Belgium. Missions were as dangerous as carrying bombs, as there was still German fighters and anti aircraft fire. In his absence French President Emmanuel Macron sent the French Military Attache General, and his delegation from the French Consulate in Washington, DC USA to the annual Bernard Marie WWII Dinner to Honor WWII Veterans, Roanoke, VA USA. 5 June 2019 AD.;.
Eleanor Roosevelt (1951), Commandeur

S

Raymond Sackler (1989) Officier (2013). MD, physician, entrepreneur, philanthropist. 
Anthony Sadler (2015) for subduing the gunman of the 2015 Thalys train attack
Charles E. de M. Sajous, pioneer of endocrinology who studied in Paris
Raymond F. Schinazi, (2018) professor, researcher, entrepreneur, philanthropist, and a world-renowned leader in the field of nucleoside chemistry and antiviral drug research awarded for his pioneering work on HIV, hepatitis B and hepatitis C.
Fred A. Schubert (1999) Chevalier of the Legion of Honor; served as a Private in the US 100th Aero Squadron as one of the last of the living veterans of World War I
Arnold Schwarzenegger (2011) bodybuilder, actor, businessman, politician
Martin Scorsese (2005) film director and advocate of film preservation
Ruth Simmons (2013) for "a career dedicated to being a visionary leader in academia"
Franklin Simon, co-founder of Franklin Simon & Co., for doing more than anyone to put American women in French clothing
Jules Herman Sitrick (2017) single-handedly captured 21 German soldiers during WWII.
Alek Skarlatos (2015) for subduing the gunman of the 2015 Thalys train attack
Belle Skinner (1921) American businesswoman and philanthropist, for her role in reconstruction after the First World War
Campbell Bascom Slemp (1932) Virginian congressman and commissioner general of the United States to the 1931 Paris Colonial Exposition
Patti Smith Poet/Author/Musician.
Steven Spielberg American film director/producer 
Spencer Stone (2015) for subduing the gunman of the 2015 Thalys train attack
Col. William Howard Stovall DC/S, USSTAFE, WWII, awards ceremony for 2nd Air Division, May 1945.
Barbra Streisand American singer, actress, songwriter, and director
Sully Sullenberger Officier (2011) US Airways Pilot who successfully landed on the Hudson River, preserving the lives of all 155 individuals on board
Bruce Sundlun (1977) Governor of Rhode Island. Recognized for his work with the French Resistance during World War II
Greggory Swarz (2015) USAF staff sergeant of the 492nd Aircraft Maintenance Unit, for saving three French Airmen from a fiery crash by pulling them from the wreckage and using a tourniquet to save the third airman whose hand was lost in the crash during a NATO training exercise at Los Llanos Air Base, Spain, where he also earned the USAF Airman's Medal
T
Tetsuo Tateishi (2017), US Army, 442nd Regimental Combat Team; presented posthumously on 21 September 2017 by Guillaume Maman, honorary consul of France in Hawaii at the Hawaii State House of Representatives
David W. Taylor, US Navy rear admiral 
John Thomas Taylor (1937), Army veteran of World War I (and later World War II) who was a lobbyist for the American Legion
Futao Terashima (2017), US Army, 442nd Regimental Combat Team; presented on 21 September 2017 by Guillaume Maman, honorary consul of France in Hawaii at the Hawaii State House of Representatives
Joseph R. Thompson (2012) Army veteran, for World War II combat service in France 
William Timlin (1991) Air Force veteran for service in France 
Robert Tuchel (2017) Army Air Corps veteran for World War II combat service over France. Also recipient of Air Medal and Distinguished Flying Cross with Clusters 
Edward Tuck (1929) financier, diplomat, and philanthropist. Awarded the Grand Cross of the Legion of Honor. 
U–W

Ann Madison Washington (1932) Official hostess at the 1931 Paris Colonial Expositon
Tony Vaccaro (1994) U.S. war photographer 
Jack Van Eaton (2015) Army veteran, for World War II combat service during the Battle of the Bulge
Melvin Van Peebles (2001) American filmmaker, writer, and artist
Malvin E. Walker (2012) Army veteran, for World War II combat service in France 
Robert Weber (2013) for his participation in the liberation of France in WWII as a member 54th Armored Infantry Battalion of the 10th Armored Division
Harvey Weinstein (2012) American film producer and film studio executive The French government said in October 2017 that it had started the process of revoking Mr. Weinstein's medal (see also Weinstein sexual abuse allegations)
Orson Welles Commandeur (1982)
Elie Wiesel Commandeur (1984) Grand-Officier (1990) Grand-Croix (2000), Holocaust survivor and author, Nobel Laureate
Paul Willis (2017) Tech Sergeant, Company G, 2nd Battalion, 329th Infantry Regiment, 83rd Infantry Division, U.S. Army, for service in Normandy, Brittany and Loire Valley campaigns in France
Daniel J. Winograd (2016) Army veteran, Chevalier for World War II combat service in France
Shelby Westbrook (2013) for his aerobatic heroism in Operation Dragoon in Southern France during WWII. As a Tuskegee Airman, one of the few Black Americans to be so honored. 
William Westmoreland (1972) Commanded US forces during the Vietnam War
Robert E. Wood (1932) Brigadier general, president of Sears Roebuck, reproduced Mount Vernon in Paris for the 1931 Colonial Exposition
Leonard Wurzel (2013) for his World War II service. 
Greg Wyler (2018) for entrepreneurship in satellite networking to close the digital divide.
X–Z
Charles E. "Chuck" Yeager, brigadier general, USAF (ret.) (2003) for his service fighting with the Maquis in 1944, flying combat in World War II and his entire career of service, duty including, but not limited to, Korea, Vietnam, Pakistan, German breaking the sound barrier and other test work (www.chuckyeager.com)
James E. Yeatts, Chevalier (2014) Veteran of U.S. Army 188th Artillery Battalion, served in numerous operations in Northern France, Belgium and Germany during World War II
Steven C. Yevich (2004) of Berwick, Pennsylvania, for his service in the 35th Infantry Division in World War II; wounded at St. Lo. 
Alvin York (1918) corporal while fighting for the AEF, for service in France. 
Elias Zerhouni (2008) M.D., director of the National Institutes of Health

Institutions/organizations 
United States Military Academy
United States Naval Academy
United States Army, 371st Infantry Regiment
United States Army, 442nd Regimental Combat Team

Uruguay 

 Hugo Batalla (1926-1998), Uruguay politician and Vice president of the Republic. Sulli

Venezuela 

Luis Hernandez Rodriguez (1912–2011), Soldier of the Spanish Republic, member of the French Resistance and Venezuelan Linotypist. Awarded in September 2006 for commanding Battalion Libertad and freeing Fort De La Pointe de Graves from German Occupation in 1945, which impeded the entrance to the French city of Bordeaux during World War 2 Entrega de la Legión de Honor a un antiguo combatiente
Simon Planas (1937), Venezuelan lawyer and politician 
Reynaldo Hahn (1937), Venezuelan composer
Frank Risquez Iribarren (1956), Venezuelan soldier and engineer
Arturo Uslar Pietri (1990), Venezuelan intellectual, lawyer, journalist, writer, television producer and politician. He won the Prince of Asturias Award (1990)
Sofia Imber, influent journalist founder of the "Museo de Arte Contemporáneo de Caracas" (Contemporary Art Museum of Caracas)
Jacinto Convit (2011), Venezuelan physician and scientist, known for developing a vaccine in an attempt to fight leprosy and his studies to cure different types of cancer. He was nominated for a Nobel Prize in Medicine for his experimental anti-leprosy vaccine.
Jose Antonio Abreu (2007), Venezuelan conductor, composer founder of El Sistema
Carlos Cruz-Diez (2012), Venezuelan kinetic and op artist. He lives in Paris. He has spent his professional career working and teaching between both Paris and Caracas. His work is represented in museums and public art sites internationally

Yemen 
Amat Al Alim Alsoswa, the United Nations assistant secretary general, assistant administrator of United Nations Development Programme (UNDP) and director of its regional bureau for Arab states. She was awarded officier in the Order of the Légion d'Honneur
Khadija Al Salami, film producer

Yugoslavia 
King Alexander I of Yugoslavia, was awarded Grand Cross
Maria of Yugoslavia, consort of King Alexander I of Yugoslavia, was awarded Grand Cross
Vladimir Cukavac, general of the Royal Yugoslav Army, was awarded in 1934
King Peter of Yugoslavia II, son of the King Alexander I of Yugoslavia, was awarded Grand Cross
Josip Broz Tito, Grand Cross was awarded on 7 May 1953
Petar Zdravkovski, general consul of Yugoslavia in Marseilles (1954–1957) was awarded officier in the Order of the Légion d'Honneur on 7 May 1953
 Liljana Todorova, (1983), philologist, University professor, diplomat
 Branko Mamula, Minister of defence SFRY, was awarded Grand Oficier

Other countries 
Colombia - Freddy Padilla de Leon, Colombian Army, General chief of staff of the Colombian Armed Forces, appointed Commandeur on 21 August 2008
Colombia – José Luis Esparza Guerrero, Colombian Army, alumnus of the French Ecole de Guerre, appointed Chevalier on 10 November 2015
Czechoslovakia – Milan Rastislav Štefánik (1914) Czechoslovak politician, diplomat, astronomer and General in French Army Tomáš Garrigue Masaryk, President of Czechoslovakia, Edvard Beneš, President of Czechoslovakia, Antonín Hasal, Czechoslovak Army general, Václav Havel, President of Czechoslovakia
 Indonesia – Suharto, president of hus country during 1967–1998
Mauritius – Edharow Rama, first Indo-Mauritian doctor, awarded the Croix de la Legion d’Honneur for saving the lives of a French ship's crew suffering from smallpox and cholera and quarantined on Plate island.
Myanmar – Aung San Suu Kyi, politician, Pro-democracy leader; won 1991 Nobel Laureate in peace. Awarded the honor by French Foreign Minister Alain Juppé on 16 January 2012
Nigeria - Sunny A. Oluseyi Jegede, prominent petroleum industry executive, and past Chairman of the Franco-Nigerian Chamber of Commerce & Industry, awarded Chevalier in 2010, for esteemed contributions to business and French/Nigerian relations.
Paraguay – Francisco Solano López, Grand Marshal and President of his country during 1862–1870, received in 1854 the Grand Cross of the Legion of Honour in the degree of Commandeur for military service
Philippines – Fidel V. Ramos, former President of the Philippines and Korean War veteran
Puerto Rico – Ramón Emeterio Betances, appointed as Chévalier in 1887
Russia – Gérard Depardieu French-born actor, citizen of the Russian Federation
Sudan – Garo Vanian, entrepreneur, awarded Chevalier as President Director General of Ararat International for grand merits.
Tunisia - Abdessalem ben Mohamed El Mohammedi (1877-1919) Leader & Caid of the  tribe, Thala, Tunisia, Knight of the Order of Glory, Tunisia, 1901, Knight of the National Order of the Legion of Honor, France, 1907, Knight of the Order of Glory, Tunisia, 1910
Slovakia - Mária Krasnohorská. Slovak ambassador to France (2001-2007)
Ukraine - President Volodymyr Zelenskyy, appointed Grand Cross 2023

References

External links
 france3-regions.francetvinfo.fr Retrieved 17 June 2015

Foreign